This is a list of programs that are to be broadcast by S+A, a defunct free-to-air and internationally carried sports and action channel owned by ABS-CBN.

For the previously aired defunct shows of this network, see List of programs aired by ABS-CBN Sports and Action.

Final broadcast

Sports

Basketball
 MPBL (2018)
2019–20 ABL season (2019)

Boxing
 Pinoy Pride (2011) (in cooperation with ALA Promotions)

Collegiate sports
UAAP (2000-2020)
NCAA (2002-2011, 2015-2020)

Volleyball
Premier Volleyball League (2017–2019)

Beach Volleyball
 Beach Volleyball Republic (2015)

Mixed martial arts / Jiu-jitsu
 Abu Dhabi Grand Slam 
 ONE Championship (2016)
 Karate Combat 
 United Fight Alliance 
 Hado Pilipinas

Cockfighting
 Sabong Pilipinas (2018)
 Sabong TV (2014)
 Sagupaan (2014)

Motoring
 Mobil 1 The Grid (2017)
 Ride Mo To (2018)
 Rev (2020)
 The Grid  
 Autospeed

Strongman
 Strongman Champions League

Sports news
 The Score (2014)
 S+A First Five

Sports magazine
 University Town (Season 3) (2016)
 Beyond The Game (2016)
 Sports U (2015)
 Gillette World Sport (2017)
 Upfront (2015)

Travel/business/health/lifestyle
 Agri TV: Hayop Ang Galing! (2014)
 Asenso Pinoy TV (2005)
 RX Plus (2014)
 Ating Alamin 
 Team FitFil (2020)

Religious shows
 Friends Again (2008)
 The Word Exposed with Luis Antonio Cardinal Tagle (2011)
 Kapamilya Daily Mass (2020, delayed telecast on S+A & Jeepney TV, also simulcasted on ABS-CBN & DZMM TeleRadyo)
 Sunday TV Mass: The Healing Eucharist (2014; 2020, delayed telecast aired on S+A, been continued airing on ABS-CBN)

Infomercials
 O Shopping (2019, aired from Mondays to Saturdays at 5am to 6am, Sundays at 6am to 7am & daily from 12mn to 1am)

Previously aired programs

See also
 S+A (defunct)
 ABS-CBN Sports
 Liga

Notes
 Available in both Free TV and International.
 Available only thru S+A International.

References

ABS-CBN Sports and Action original programming
Lists of television series by network